The Poppenberg is a tree-covered hill east of Ilfeld in the Harz mountains of Germany, at an elevation of 601 metres. Since 1897, there has been a  steel lattice observation tower on the summit. The tower was built by the Nordhausen branch of the Harz Club and was named after Otto, Prince of Stolberg-Wernigerode. In good weather, it has an extensive view over the South Harz, the Goldene Aue and the Kyffhäuser.

The Poppenberg is no. 92 in the system of check points in the Harzer Wandernadel network of walking trails.

History
Until 1932, the hill belonged to the Prussian Province of Hanover, but was then transferred to the Province of Saxony. Today, it lies in the free state of Thuringia and is the highest elevation in the Thuringian part of the Harz. In 1994, the Poppenberg Observation Tower, the hill's lattice observation tower, was refurbished.

Geography
The Poppenberg is situated east of Ilfeld, in the Harz mountains, in the state of Thuringia.

See also
Poppenberg Observation Tower
Gillerberg Observation Tower
Schomberg Observation Tower

References

External links
HarzLife

Hills of the Harz
Hills of Thuringia
Nordhausen (district)